The Pascoag Grammar School, also previously the Burrillville High School, is a historic school building at 265 Sayles Avenue in the Pascoag village of Burrillville, Rhode Island.  The Colonial Revival school was built in 1917 by Thomas McLaughlin and Mahoney & Coffey to replace a previous school that had burned.  There had been a school on the site since at least the mid-19th century.  The school is a T-shaped brick structure  stories high.  It has fifteen bays across its main facade, with a raised center entrance.  When built it first served as the town's high school.  In 1936 a new high school building was built, and this one the served strictly as an elementary school until it was closed in 1995.  It sat vacant until 2005, when it was acquired by a developer and rehabilitated.

The building was added to the National Register of Historic Places in 2006. In 2007, it was converted into condominiums.

See also
National Register of Historic Places listings in Providence County, Rhode Island

References

School buildings completed in 1917
School buildings on the National Register of Historic Places in Rhode Island
Burrillville, Rhode Island
Buildings and structures in Providence County, Rhode Island
National Register of Historic Places in Providence County, Rhode Island
1917 establishments in Rhode Island